Baladityapura, also called Aninditapura, was a city near Vyadhapura, the former capital of Funan Kingdom, on the opposite bank of the Mekong River.

History 
Baladityapura was founded by Baladitya during the reign of King Isanavarman I in the early 7th century CE. After moving from Indrapura or Amarendrapura, King Jayavarman II established new capital, Mahendraparvata on the sacred hill top site of Phnom Kulen. After a century, it was abandoned when King Yasovarman I translocated the capital from Hariharalaya to  Yasodharapura.

References 

Angkorian sites in Takéo Province
Former populated places in Cambodia